The fourth World Series of Poker Europe (WSOPE) took place from September 14, 2010 to September 28, 2010. There were five bracelet events, culminating in the  £10,350 WSOPE Championship No-Limit Hold'em event. Events were held at the Empire Casino in Leicester Square.

Key

Results

Event 1: £2,650 Six Handed No Limit Hold'em
3-Day Event: September 14, 2010 to September 16, 2010 
Number of buy-ins: 244
Total Prize Pool: £610,000
Number of Payouts: 24
Winning Hand:

Event 2: £5,250 Pot Limit Omaha
3-Day Event: September 16, 2010 to September 18, 2010
Number of buy-ins: 120
Total Prize Pool: £600,000
Number of Payouts: 18
Winning Hand:

Event 3: £1,075 No Limit Hold'em
5-Day Event: September 17, 2010 to September 21, 2010
Number of buy-ins: 582
Total Prize Pool: £582,000
Number of Payouts: 54
Winning Hand:

Event 4: £10,350 No Limit Hold'em High Roller Heads-Up
3-Day Event: September 21, 2010 to September 23, 2010
Number of buy-ins: 103
Total Prize Pool: £1,030,000
Number of Payouts: 16
Winning Hand:

Event 5: £10,350 WSOPE Championship No Limit Hold'em
6-Day Event: September 23, 2010 to September 28, 2010 
Number of buy-ins: 346
Total Prize Pool: £3,460,000
Number of Payouts: 36
Winning Hand: 

World Series of Poker Europe
2010 in poker